Ponvannan (born Shanmugam; 23 September 1963) is an Indian actor and director who has worked in Tamil cinema and television. After beginning his career as an artist (painter), Ponvannan apprenticed as a director and writer under Bharathiraja. He subsequently made his directorial debut with Annai Vayal (1992), before making the critically acclaimed venture, Nadhi Karaiyinile (2003). He has since appeared as a supporting actor in films, winning acclaim for his role in films including Paruthiveeran (2007), Ayan (2009) and Kaaviya Thalaivan (2014). In October 2015, he was elected as the Vice President of the Nadigar Sangam alongside Karunas.

Career 
Ponvannan began his career as an artist in his home town of Erode and became acquainted with writer Valampuri John, which led to him working for producer Kovaithambi's Motherland Pictures. Through his exposure, gained at the production house, he began to apprentice under director Bharathiraja and helped the director write dialogues for his films. Ponvannan gradually was introduced as an actor by Bharathiraja and appeared in supporting roles in the director's Pudhu Nellu Pudhu Naathu (1991), Karuthamma (1994) and Pasumpon (1995). During the period, he also made the low-budget film Annai Vayal, which went unnoticed. Throughout the 1990s, he appeared in further supporting roles, often typecast as the villain in films.

His second directorial venture, Jameela (2003), featuring Suvalakshmi, Rajan P. Dev and Ramji, told the story of an ego clash between two men which ruins the life of an obedient woman. Ponvannan had been impressed with writer Sara Abubakar's novel and bought the script rights, before submitting his screenplay to National Film Development Corporation of India to finance the film. The agency agreed and Jameela was shot for seventeen days in Pondicherry at a cost of 35 lakh rupees. The film won positive reviews in screenings and was well received by critics, prompting it to be selected to be shown in the non-competitive category at the 2002 Shanghai International Film Festival.

After being censored in 2001,   the film had only a theatrical release across India in November 2003 under the title Nadhi Karaiyinile, after the distributor Viswas Sundar did not want the film to be classified as a "Muslim film".

The film did not perform well at the box office, but won three State film awards including the recognition as Best Film portraying Women in Good Light. The Hindu described Ponvannan's direction as an "absorbing presentation", adding "his sensitivity comes to the fore throughout the film". His next venture, the comedy drama Gomathi Nayagam (2004), had its title taken from the name of his popular character from the television serial Annamalai. The film had a low-key release and did not perform well commercially.

Ponvannan made a comeback as an actor through Ameer's Paruthiveeran (2007), portraying the father of Priyamani's character, and the success of the film garnered further acting opportunities for him. He won acclaim for his performances as the upright police officer in Mysskin's Anjathe (2009) and as the shrewd customs official in Ayan (2009). Ponvannan played a stage actor in Vasanthabalan's period film Kaaviya Thalaivan (2014), winning acclaim for his performance in an ensemble cast.

Personal life 
Ponvannan married National Award-winning actress Saranya, daughter of  Malayalam director A. B. Raj, in 1995.

Filmography

As actor

As director

Television

References

External links 
 

Indian male film actors
Tamil male actors
Male actors from Tamil Nadu
Living people
1963 births
People from Erode district